Nydalen station is a railway station on the Gjøvik Line in Oslo, Norway. The station was built opened in 1946, and is located between Grefsen and Kjelsås. Like most of the local Oslo stations on the Gjøvik Line, Nydalen is a small station. It is unmanned, has only a single wooden platform, and is served only by commuter trains. Close by, but not in connection, is a subway station with the same name, Nydalen.

The station is located in Nordre Aker borough. The area around the stations is largely industrial, though the area (Nydalen) is gradually being changed into a more residential-industrial mix. Close by is BI Norwegian Business School campus.

On December 23, 2009, the station was reopened following upgrades to the station infrastructure.

References

External links
Entry at Jernbaneverket 
Entry at the Norwegian Railway Club 

Railway stations in Oslo
Railway stations on the Gjøvik Line
Railway stations opened in 1946
1946 establishments in Norway